The Joseph Needham Professorship of Chinese History, Science and Civilisation (李約瑟漢學教授席位) is the senior professorship of Chinese at the University of Cambridge.

The chair is the successor to the Professorship of Chinese, founded in 1888 and the first of three successive Chinese professorships at Cambridge. The first chair was created for the single tenure of Sir Thomas Wade and did not entitle the holder to a stipend. Following Wade's retirement, this first establishment was renewed once for the tenure of Herbert Giles, but was then suppressed.

A new chair, the Professorship of Chinese Language and History, was established in 1933, again for a single tenure. The professorship was re-established in 1938 for a second tenure; and again in 1952 for a third tenure, this time retitled to the Professorship of Chinese. The second chair expired after the tenure of its third incumbent.

The current chair was permanently established in 1966 as the Professorship of Chinese. In 2008, this professorship was endowed with £2,000,000 and renamed in honour of Joseph Needham 李約瑟.

Professors of Chinese (1888)

 1888–1895 Sir Thomas Wade 威妥瑪
 1897–1932 Herbert Giles 翟理斯

1933 professorship

Professors of Chinese Language and History

 1933–1938 Arthur Christopher Moule
 1938–1951 Gustav Haloun 哈隆

Professor of Chinese

 1953–1966 Edwin G. Pulleyblank

1966 professorship

Professors of Chinese

 1968–1981 Denis C. Twitchett 崔瑞德
 1985–1988 Glen Dudbridge 杜德橋
 1989–2006 David L. McMullen 麥大維
 2007–2008 Roel Sterckx 胡司德 (professorship retitled in 2008)

Joseph Needham Professor of Chinese History, Science, and Civilization
 2008– Roel Sterckx 胡司德 (incumbent since 2007)

References 

Joseph Needham
Chinese History Science and Civilization, Joseph Needham
School of Arts and Humanities, University of Cambridge
Chinese History Science and Civilization, Joseph Needham
1888 establishments in England